Lentinus flexipes is a species of fungus belonging to the family Polyporaceae.

Synonyms:
 Polyporus tricholoma Mont Annales des Sciences Naturelles Botanique 8: 365 (1837) (= basionym)

References

Polyporaceae